Gonanticlea occlusata is a moth of the family Geometridae first described by Felder in 1875. It is found in the north-eastern Himalayas of India, Sri Lanka, Tonkin, Peninsular Malaysia and Borneo.

In females, the broad border to the medial bar is straight. The forewings of the male are a much darker green, whereas the female has a few greenish patches only. The hindwings of both sexes are yellowish.

Two subspecies are recognized.
Gonanticlea occlusata kinabalensis Prout, 1939 - Borneo
Gonanticlea occlusata laetifica Prout, 1931 - Tonkin

References

Moths of Asia
Moths described in 1875